In peer-to-peer networks, Koorde is a distributed hash table (DHT) system based on the Chord DHT and the De Bruijn graph (De Bruijn sequence). Inheriting the simplicity of Chord, Koorde meets  hops per node (where  is the number of nodes in the DHT), and  hops per lookup request with  neighbors per node.

The Chord concept is based on a wide range of identifiers (e.g. 2) in a structure of a ring where an identifier can stand for both node and data. Node-successor is responsible for the whole range of IDs between itself and its predecessor.

De Bruijn's graphs

Koorde is based on Chord but also on the De Bruijn graph (De Bruijn sequence).
In a -dimensional de Bruijn graph, there are  nodes, each of which has a unique ID with  bits.

Each shift corresponds to a routing hop to the next intermediate address; the hop is valid because each node's neighbors are the two possible outcomes of shifting a 0 or 1 onto its own address. Because of the structure of de Bruijn graphs, when the last bit of  has been shifted, the query will be at node . Node  responds whether key  exists.

Routing example

For example, when a message needs to be routed from node 2 (which is ) to 6 (which is ), the steps are following:

 Node 2 routes the message to Node 5 (using its connection to ), shifts the bits left and puts  as the youngest bit (right side).
 Node 5 routes the message to Node 3 (using its connection to ), shifts the bits left and puts  as the youngest bit (right side).
 Node 3 routes the message to Node 6 (using its connection to ), shifts the bits left and puts  as the youngest bit (right side).

Non-constant degree Koorde

The -dimensional de Bruijn can be generalized to base , in which case node  is connected to nodes , . Each de Bruijn routing step can be emulated with an expected constant number of messages, so routing uses  expected hops- For , we get  degree and  diameter.

Lookup algorithm

function n.lookup(k, shift, i)
{
    if k ∈ (n, s]
        return (s);
    else if i ∈ (n, s]
        return p.lookup(k, shift << 1, i ∘ topBit(shift));
    else
        return s.lookup(k, shift, i);
}
Pseudocode for the Koorde lookup algorithm at node :
  is the key
  is the imaginary De Bruijn node
  is the reference to the predecessor of 
  is the reference to the successor of

References
"Internet Algorithms" by Greg Plaxton, Fall 2003: 
"Koorde: A simple degree-optimal distributed hash table" by M. Frans Kaashoek and David R. Karger: 
Chord and Koorde descriptions: 

File sharing networks
Distributed data storage
Hash based data structures
Hashing